Tom Sawyer is a fictional character created by Mark Twain.

Tom Sawyer may also refer to:

The Adventures of Tom Sawyer, Twain's original novel featuring the character
 The Adventures of Tom Sawyer (disambiguation)

Art, entertainment, and media

In film and television
 Tom Sawyer (1907 film), a silent film produced by Kalem Studios
 Tom Sawyer (1917 film), a silent film produced by Paramount Pictures, starring Jack Pickford
 Tom Sawyer (1930 film), first sound film version, starring Jackie Coogan
 Tom Sawyer (1938 film), first Technicolor film version, produced by David O. Selznick and starring Tommy Kelly
 Tom Sawyer (1956 musical), a TV musical starring John Sharpe as Tom Sawyer
 The Adventures of Tom Sawyer (1960 series), a seven-episode series starring Fred Smith as Tom Sawyer
 Tom Sawyer (1973 film), a musical film starring Johnny Whitaker as Tom Sawyer and Jodie Foster as Becky Thatcher
 Tom Sawyer (2000 film), an animated film that features anthropomorphic animal characters

Other media
 "Tom Sawyer" (song), a 1981 song by Rush
 Tom Sawyer (album), a reading by Bing Crosby of an abridged version of The Adventures of Tom Sawyer

People 
 Tom Sawyer (darts player) (born 1969), American darts player
 Tom Sawyer (Kansas politician) (born 1958), politician
 Tom Sawyer (Maine politician) (born 1949), American politician and businessman from Maine
 Tom Sawyer (Ohio politician) (born 1945), Democratic U.S. Congressman from Ohio from 1987 to 2003
 Tom Sawyer, Baron Sawyer (born 1943), British politician and trade unionist
 Tom Sawyer (American football), American college football coach
 Anthony Cooper (Lost) or Tom Sawyer, a fictional character in the TV series Lost
 Thomas Sawyer (footballer) (1874–?), British footballer

Sawyer, Tom